Otto Richard Kierulf (29 January 1825 – 7 January 1897) was a Norwegian military officer, politician and sports administrator.

Biography
Otto Richard Kierulf was born in Christiania (now Oslo). Kierulf was the son of Lieutenant Colonel Christian Kierulf and Anne Marie Sofie Winge. He was born into a military family.  He took his officer training in the infantry and was promoted to second lieutenant in 1842. In 1847, he entered the artillery and advanced in 1860 to lieutenant colonel.

He was the first leader of Norwegian Olympic and Paralympic Committee and Confederation of Sports (Centralforeningen for Udbredelse af Legemsøvelser og Vaabenbrug), first from 1861 to 1864, and again from 1867 to 1869.

He served as a member of Christiania City Council, and was deputy to Parliament for Christiania during the period 1871–1873. He served as Norwegian prime minister in Stockholm (1873–1884) and served as the Norwegian prime minister of the interim government (1875–1881).

In 1859 he was appointed knight  in the  Order of Saint Olav and promoted to Grand Cross in 1873.
He was the knight of the Royal Order of the Seraphim, the Order of Vasa, the Order of Charles XIII, and of the Order of the Danneborg. He died during 1897 in Oslo and was buried at Vestre gravlund.

References

External links
Norwegian Prime Minister in Stockholm

1825 births
1897 deaths
Military personnel from Oslo
Norwegian Army generals
Norwegian sports executives and administrators
Prime Ministers of Norway
19th-century Norwegian politicians
19th-century Norwegian military personnel
Politicians from Oslo
Commanders First Class of the Order of Vasa
Knights of the Order of Charles XIII
Recipients of the St. Olav's Medal
Knights of the Order of the Dannebrog
Officers of the Order of Saints Maurice and Lazarus